Stephen Banks Leonard (April 15, 1793 – May 8, 1876) was an American newspaperman and politician who served two non-consecutive terms as a U.S. Representative from New York from 1835 to 1837, and from 1839 to 1841.

Biography 
Born in New York City, Leonard attended the public schools.
He moved with his parents to Owego, New York, and learned the printer's trade.
He engaged in newspaper work in Albany, New York.
He moved to New York City and subsequently returned to Owego.
He was publisher and editor of the Owego Gazette 1814–1835.
Trustee of the village of Owego.
Supervisor and commissioner of excise.
Trustee of Owego Academy for many years.
He established the first stage route from Owego to Bath in 1816.
Postmaster of Owego 1816–1820.

Congress 
Leonard was elected as a Jacksonian to the Twenty-fourth Congress (March 4, 1835 – March 3, 1837).

Leonard was elected as a Democrat to the Twenty-sixth Congress (March 4, 1839 – March 3, 1841).
He served as chairman of the Committee on Public Buildings and Grounds (Twenty-sixth Congress).
He declined to be a candidate for reelection in 1840 to the Twenty-seventh Congress.

Later career and death 
He engaged in mercantile and agricultural pursuits.
Supervisor of Owego 1854–1856.
Deputy United States marshal 1857–1861.

He died in Owego, New York, May 8, 1876.
He was interred in the Presbyterian Church Burying Ground.

Sources

1793 births
1876 deaths
United States Marshals
Jacksonian members of the United States House of Representatives from New York (state)
19th-century American politicians
Democratic Party members of the United States House of Representatives from New York (state)
People from Owego, New York